The Philippines national futsal team represents the Philippines in various international futsal competitions under the Philippine Football Federation and is affiliated with the Asian Football Confederation.

History
An informal form of futsal is being played in the Philippines as early as the 1960s to the 1980s, which is usually played as part of a cross training for footballers during rainy weather using regular association football rules. It was only in the late 1990s, that official futsal international tournaments were held and during this time the Philippine national team is already playing international friendlies under coaches Noel Casilao and Hans Smit.

Competition records

FIFA Futsal World Cup
 1989 to 1992 – Did not enter
 1996 – Did not qualify
 2000 – Did not enter
 2004 – Did not qualify
 2008 – Did not enter
 2012 to 2016 – Did not qualify
 2020 – Did not enter

AFC Futsal Championship
 1999 to 2003 – Did not enter
 2004 to 2005 – Group stage
 2006 – Did not enter
 2007 – Group Stage
 2008 – Did not enter
 2010 to 2016 – Did not qualify
 2018 – Did not enter
 2020 – Did not enter

AFF Futsal Championship
 2001 to 2005 – Group stage
 2006 – Did not enter
 2007 to 2008 – Group stage
 2009 to 2010 – Fourth place
 2011 – Canceled
 2012 to 2015 – Group stage
 2016 – Did not enter
 2017 – Group stage
 2018 – Withdrew
 2019 – Did not enter

Southeast Asian Games
 2007 - Group stage
 2011 – Group stage
 2013 to 2017– Did not enter

Coaches
  Esmaeil Sedigh (2007–2012)
  Baltazar Avelino (2013–2016)
  Christian Dominquez (2017)

References

Asian national futsal teams
Futsal
Futsal in the Philippines